The 2020–21 Sunshine Tour was the 21st season of professional golf tournaments since the southern Africa-based Sunshine Tour was relaunched in 2000. The Sunshine Tour represented the highest level of competition for male professional golfers in the region.

The tour was based predominantly in South Africa with other events originally being scheduled in Eswatini, Zambia, Mauritius and Kenya.

In light of the COVID-19 pandemic, the tour announced a suspension on 16 March. Later, the first two scheduled tournaments, the Investec Royal Swazi Open and the Zambia Open, were postponed. On 5 August, the tour announced its resumption, starting in mid-August with a new series of five 54-hole tournaments, called the "Rise Up Series".

In January 2021, the schedule was once again disrupted by the COVID-19 pandemic as several tournaments scheduled for early in the year were postponed by a month or more, with the season restarting in March. Among the tournaments affected were three co-sanctioned events with the Challenge Tour.

Schedule
The following table lists official events during the 2020–21 season.

Order of Merit
The Order of Merit was based on prize money won during the season, calculated in South African rand.

Notes

References

External links

Sunshine Tour
Sunshine Tour
Sunshine Tour